Badami is a town in Karnataka, India.

Badami may also refer to:

Historical Badami and its associations
 Badami cave temples, a complex of Hindu and Jain cave temples

Contemporary organizations and places in or near Badami
 Badami Assembly constituency, one of 224 assembly constituencies in Karnataka
 Badami railway station
 Gonal, a village near to and politically associated with Badami

Other places
 Badami Oil Field, an oil field in the Alaska North Slope

People
 Andrea Badami (1913–2002), an American painter
 Anita Rau Badami (born 24 September 1961), a Canadian writer
 Stefano Badami (December 10, 1888 – March 31, 1955), first boss of the Elizabeth crime family

 Chris Badami, an American musician, record producer and audio engineer
 Sarvottam Badami (1910–2005), Indian film director
 Venkatrao K. Badami (12 January 1888 – c. 1950), an Indian agronomist and a pioneer of plant breeding
 Waseem Badami, Pakistani television host and news anchor